The Devonian Catskill Formation or the Catskill Clastic wedge is a unit of mostly terrestrial sedimentary rock found in Pennsylvania and New York. Minor marine layers exist in this thick rock unit (up to ). It is equivalent to the Hampshire Formation of Maryland, West Virginia, and Virginia.

The Catskill is the largest bedrock unit of the Upper Devonian in northeast Pennsylvania and the Catskill region of New York, from which its name is derived. The Pocono Mountains of Pennsylvania are largely underlain by this unit as well. The rocks of the Catskill are predominantly red sandstone indicating a large scale terrestrial deposition during the Acadian orogeny. Many beds are cyclical in nature, preserving the record of a dynamic environment during its approximately 20 million years of deposition.

Depositional environment 

During the Devonian period, the Catskill Delta was formed by a series of river deltas and otherwise marshy terrain. This terrain was sandwiched between the epicontinental Kaskaskia Sea in central North America and the now-vanished Acadian Mountains. Erosion brought sediment from the mountain westwards into the sea, forming the deltas.

Eventually the Delta formation was buried and transformed into sandstone, which was then revealed in places when the Catskill and Appalachian Mountains were formed at a later date. This transformation and uncovering is the primary reason why the Catskill Delta is notable in the present; western Pennsylvania's petroleum was formed as a consequence. This was the first major oil region to be developed.

The Catskill was once considered to be related to the Old Red Sandstone, but in actuality the two are only coincidentally similar. Both formed at approximately the same time, and under similar conditions: to the north of the Acadian Mountains were the Caledonian Mountains, and a similar region of marsh and river delta formed there.

Glacial Erosion 
Though both mountain ranges were formed during the Acadian orogeny, the Catskill Mountains, unlike the Appalachian Mountains underwent glacial erosion. Much of what formed the Catskills as they stand today is a result of the Wisconsin glaciation which ended only about 12,000 years ago.

Signs of Glaciation 
There are many signs of the Glacial period event which carved the current day Catskill Mountains.

These markers include:

 Glacial Erratics such as the Devils Tombstone
 Striations
 "Dance Floors" such as Pratt Rock
Terminal moraines

Members

Eastern Pennsylvania 
Towamensing, Walcksville, Beaverdam Run, Long Run, Packerton, Poplar Gap, Sawmill Run, Berry Run, Clarks Ferry, and Duncannon.

Central Pennsylvania 
Irish Valley, Sherman Creek, Buddys Run, Clarks Ferry, and Duncannon.

References

External links 

 Depositional environments in the Catskill Clastic Wedge
 Devonian Times Website summarize about Red Hill Shale in Catskill Formation 

Geologic formations of New York (state)
Geologic formations of Pennsylvania
Devonian System of North America
Devonian geology of Pennsylvania
Devonian geology of New York (state)
Devonian southern paleotemperate deposits
Sandstone formations of the United States
Shale formations of the United States
Siltstone formations
Deltaic deposits